Martin Verkerk was the defending champion but lost in the quarterfinals to Grégory Carraz.

Antony Dupuis won in the final 6–4, 6–7(12–14), 7–6(7–5) against Mario Ančić.

Seeds
A champion seed is indicated in bold text while text in italics indicates the round in which that seed was eliminated.

  Jiří Novák (withdrew because of a leg injury)
  Martin Verkerk (quarterfinals)
  Tommy Robredo (quarterfinals)
  Feliciano López (first round)
  Ivan Ljubičić (first round)
  Rafael Nadal (second round)
  Sargis Sargsian (second round)
  Dominik Hrbatý (second round)

Draw

External links
 ITF tournament edition details
 Singles draw
 Qualifying Singles draw

Milan Indoor
2004 ATP Tour
Milan
2004 Milan Indoor